Hvítanes is a village in the Faroe Islands. It is on Streymoy's east coast, northeast of Hoyvík and Tórshavn. Its name means "White Point" in Faroese.

Hvítanes is located in a little bay with a stone beach and a harbour where the small boats can be pulled up a ramp out of reach of the sometimes destructive sea.

It was founded in 1837.

The Eysturoyartunnilin surfaces near Hvítanes and connects Tórshavn with the Skálafjørður on Eysturoy.

See also
 List of towns in the Faroe Islands

References

External links
Faroeislands.dk: Hvítanes Images and description of all cities on the Faroe Islands.

Populated places in the Faroe Islands
Populated places established in 1837